Pedro Colón Osorio is a Puerto Rican politician and former mayor of Ceiba, Puerto Rico. Colón is affiliated with the New Progressive Party (PNP) and served as mayor from 2009 to 2013. Prior been the mayor of Ceiba, Puerto Rico, Pedro Colón Osorio served in the Vietnam War and later in the United States Army Reserve until he retired with the rank Coronel.

References

Living people
People from Ceiba, Puerto Rico
Mayors of places in Puerto Rico
New Progressive Party (Puerto Rico) politicians
United States Army personnel of the Vietnam War
United States Army reservists
Puerto Rican military officers
Year of birth missing (living people)